Alfred Swaine Taylor (11 December 1806 in Northfleet, Kent – 27 May 1880 in London) was an English toxicologist and medical writer, who has been called the "father of British forensic medicine". He was also an early experimenter in photography.

Career
Taylor studied medicine at Guy's Hospital and St Thomas's Hospital and was appointed Lecturer in Medical Jurisprudence at Guy's Hospital in 1831. In 1832 he succeeded Alexander Barry as joint Lecturer on Chemistry with Arthur Aitken. He published textbooks on medical jurisprudence and toxicology, contributed to the Dublin Quarterly Journal and medical periodicals, and edited the Medical Gazette. He was the main dissector of Lavinia Edwards's body, a woman who was determined to have been born male, and he wrote extensively about her. He appeared as expert witness in several widely reported murder cases. He also developed the use of hyposulphate of lime as a fixing agent for photography.

He is buried at Highgate Cemetery.

Works
On the Art of Photogenic Drawing, 1840
The Elements of Medical Jurisprudence Interspersed with a copious selection of curious and instructive cases and analyses of opinions delivered at coroners' inquests, 1843
Manual of Medical Jurisprudence, 1844
Medical jurisprudence, 1845
A thermometric table on the scales of fahrenheit, centigrade and Reaumur, compressing the most remarkable phenomena connected with temperature, 1845
On the Temperature of the Earth and Sea in Reference to the Theory of Central Heat, 1846
On poisons in relation to medical jurisprudence and medicine, 1848
On poisoning by strychnia, with comments on the medical evidence at the trial of William Palmer for the murder of John Parsons Cook, 1856
The principles and practice of medical jurisprudence, 1865

References

External links

Picture at Science and Society website
Coley, Noel G., 'Alfred Swaine Taylor, MD, FRS (1806–1880): forensic toxicologist', Medical History, 1991, 35:409–427
Earles, M. P., ‘Taylor, Alfred Swaine (1806–1880)’, Oxford Dictionary of National Biography, Oxford University Press, 2004, accessed 20 Dec 2007
Flanagan, Robert James and Katherine Watson, 'Alfred Swaine Taylor MD FRS (1806–1880)'

1806 births
1880 deaths
Burials at Highgate Cemetery
19th-century English medical doctors
English medical writers
Medical jurisprudence
Fellows of the Royal Society
British toxicologists